Atlanta Civil War Campaign Game is an American Civil War board wargame published by Guidon Games in 1973.

Description
Atlanta Civil War Campaign Game is a two-player or two-team wargame that simulates the series of battles in 1864 known as the Battle of Atlanta. The boxed set includes
 18.75" x 25" two-color hex grid map
 240 counters
 two sets of 6 battle cards (one for defense, the other for attack)
 rulebook

The players can choose to play individual battles (Rocky Face Ridge, Pumpkin Vine Creek, Kennesaw Mountain, or Peachtree Creek), or can play all of them as an extended campaign.

Publication history
Atlanta Civil War Campaign Game was designed by Guidon Games owner Don Lowry, and published by Guidon Games in 1973.

Reviews
 Conflict Issue #7 (June 1974)
 Fire & Movement Issue #19 (Oct./Nov. 1979)

References

External links

American Civil War board wargames
Board games introduced in 1973
Guidon Games games
Wargames introduced in 1973